Bust Down is an American comedy television series co-created by and co-starring Langston Kerman, Jak Knight, Chris Redd, and Sam Jay. The series premiered on Peacock on March 10, 2022.

Plot
The series follows a group of friends working low-wage jobs at a casino in Gary, Indiana.

Cast
 Chris Redd as Chris, a valet
 Sam Jay as Sam, a cook
 Langston Kerman as Langston, a janitor
 Jak Knight as Jak, a stockroom worker
 Phi Tran as Tiki, Sam's sidepiece
 DomiNque Perry as Nina, Sam's girlfriend
Freddie Gibbs as Chauncey, the casino's HR manager

Production
Bust Down was produced by Universal Television and Lorne Michaels' Broadway Video. Michaels was executive producer with Hilary Marx, Andrew Singer, Richie Keen, and Guy Stodel, as well as series creators and stars Langston Kerman, Jak Knight, Chris Redd, and Sam Jay. They described the show as predominantly about friendship and their intention for the show's comedy to be "raunchy, irreverent, and complicated."

The series premiered on Peacock on March 10, 2022. All six episodes were released simultaneously.

Episodes

Reception
The series received mainly positive critical reception. It holds a score of 76/100 on review aggregator Metacritic. Angie Han of The Hollywood Reporter praised Bust Down: "the series’ comic voice is admirably bold — and if you’re left cold by one joke, there are usually three more coming right on its tail." Ebony's Savannah Taylor described the show: "abandoning the appeal of respectability politics and good-mannered humor, this show...is the definition of doing hood rat stuff with your friends" and praised the comedy as "just straight up, raw Black tomfoolery." Richard Roeper rated the series 3/4 stars and hailed the "biting social commentary, some ridiculously effective over-the-top physical shtick and a steady stream of laugh-out-loud moments" but also noted that the show "“will have some viewers bailing within the first 10 minutes of the premiere episode." Nina Metz gave Bust Down 3/4 stars in the Chicago Tribune and called the creators and stars "goofy as hell, but also intelligent and thoughtful and self-aware, which allows them to take on otherwise touchy subject matter."

References

External links 
Official website
 

2020s American black television series
2020s American comedy television series
2022 American television series debuts
English-language television shows
Peacock (streaming service) original programming
Television series by Broadway Video
Television series by Universal Television
Television shows set in Indiana
African-American television